José Pedraza González (born May 8, 1989) is a Puerto Rican professional boxer and former two-weight world champion. He held the IBO super featherweight title in 2014, the IBF super featherweight title from 2015 to 2017, and the WBO lightweight title in 2018. As an amateur he represented Puerto Rico, winning medals in multiple international competitions. Among the awards he achieved are a bronze medal at the 2007 Pan American Games, silver at the 2009 World Championships and gold at the 2010 Central American and Caribbean Games, as well as participation in the 2008 Summer Olympics. As of June 2021, he is ranked as the world's eighth best active super lightweight by BoxRec.

Amateur career

Early career and Pan American Games
Pedraza participated in the 2006 Copa La Romana. In the quarter finals he defeated Javier Fortuna (27:5). He secured the bronze medal with a 12:9 victory over V.Castillo of Ecuador. Pedraza won the tournament's gold medal over localist boxer Jonathan Batista (10:5). In December, he won the lightweight national championship, defeating Hector Marengo (18:15) in the finals of the Torneo Nacional Isaac Barrientos. On February 4, 2007, Pedraza debuted in the Pan American Games Qualifier defeating Oscar Diaz of the Dominican Republic (13:6). He qualified to the event by winning the bronze medal, losing (16:8) to localist Lisandro Bolivar in the semifinals. On March 31, 2007, Pedraza participated in a dual against Trinidad, winning (26:19) a contest over Jules De Gannes. He entered the IX Torneo José "Cheo" Aponte, debuting with a victory over Shemuel Pagan of the United States. Pedraza won the event's silver medal, losing to Jean Gomis by hit count after the contest finished tied 8:8. At the Pan American Games, he debuted winning (26:7) his preliminary over Jose Virula Lopez of Guatemala. Pedraza advanced to the medal round defeating Lisandro Bolivar of Venezuela. He won the tournament's bronze medal, losing (7:2) to localist Everton Lopes. Pedraza entered the 2007 World Amateur Boxing Championships, but lost (25:17) his preliminary contest against Sadam Ali. He closed the year participating in a dual against France, losing (15:5) to Daouda Sow.

Summer Olympics and World Cup
In January 2008, Pedraza defended the lightweight national championship, defeating Reynaldo Ojeda (20:11) in the finals of the Torneo Nacional Isaac Barrientos. At the American Olympic Qualifier, he debuted with a 20:4 victory over Valentino Knowles of Bahamas. In the quarterfinals he lost (13:5) to Yordenis Ugas. In April 2008, he entered the second American Olympic Qualifier, stopping Omar Ward of Barbados in the second round of his preliminary. He guaranteed a medal by defeating (15:8) Juan Cuellar of Argentina. In the semifinals, Pedraza stopped Alexis Folleco of Ecuador in the third round. He won the tournament's gold medal and qualified to the 2008 Summer Olympics by defeating Lopes in a rematch. Pedraza debuted in the X Torneo José "Cheo" Aponte with a victory (19:8) over countryman Alberto Mercado. In the finals he defeated Shemuel Pagan of the United States by walkover. Prior to the Olympics Pedraza participated in the XXXVIII International Golden Belt Tournament, advancing to the semifinals before losing (37:25) to Vladimir Saruhanyan of Russia. As part of their training the boxing team moved to South Korea, in order to adapt to the time-zone. After training and participating in a series of exhibition matches, the team traveled from Corea to Beijin.

In his first Olympic fight, Pedraza defeated Onur Şipal of Turkey by points, with scores of 10–3. Throughout the event, his strategy focused on maintaining a solid defense while connecting combinations to his opponent's body. Pedraza lost his second preliminary to Daouda Sow of France by points, 13:9. He entered the 2008 Boxing World Cup, advancing to the semifinals with an 8:2 win over Georgian Popescu of Romania. He won the bronze medal, losing (14:4) his next contest to Albert Selimov of Russia. In February 2008, Pedraza defended the lightweight national championship in the Torneo Nacional Isaac Barrientos, defeating Reynaldo Cintron in the preliminaries, Erick Vidal in the quarterfinals (WO), Edgardo Rivera in the semifinals and Ken Alvarez in the final (10:3). In May 2009, he entered the XII Torneo José "Cheo" Aponte and competed in the light welterweight limit, winning his first contest over Pedro Vicente by stoppage in three rounds. Pedraza won the silver medal, losing to Bernard Lebron in the finals by hit score following a 16:16 tie.

World medalist and regional championship
At the 2009 World Amateur Boxing Championships, Pedraza debuted by defeating Abdlay Anarbay of Kazakhstan (10:4). In his second contest, he defeated Zorigtbaataryn Enkhzorig of Mongolia (4:3). In the third date Pedraza defeated (6:5) Ljubomir Marjanovic of Serbia. A medal was secured with a (14:4) victory over Serdar Khudayberdiyev of Turkey in the quarterfinals. He advanced winning his contest against Albert Selimov, 9:5. In the finals, he lost a decision (9:4) to localist Domenico Valentino, winning the silver medal. In December 2009, Pedraza participated in the AIBA Presidents Cup, winning in his debut over Enkhzorig Zorigtbaatar. He lost a 21 decision to Semen Grivachev in the semifinals. An invitation was extended to him and the Arroyo brothers to participate in the World Series of Boxing, but it was declined. In January 2010, Pedraza defended the lightweight national championship in the finals of the Torneo Nacional Isaac Barrientos, defeating Jorge Maysonet, Jr. (4:3) in the quarterfinals, Jose Davila (3:2) in the semifinals and Edgardo Lopez in the finals. In April 2010, he defeated Davila (5:3) in the national team's selection meeting. In May 2010, he entered the XIII Torneo José "Cheo" Aponte, defeating Antonio Ortiz in the semifinals and Davila (5:0) in the final. He entered the 2010 Copa Olimpica, defeating Antonio Ortiz by points. In June 2010, Pedraza participated in the 2010 Pan-American Championships, debuting with a 14:1 victory over Joan Gonzalez of Venezuela. In the semifinals he defeated Erick Bonez (7:0). Pedraza won the silver medal, losing (8:3) to Yasnier Toledo Lopez in the final. In July he participated in the 2010 Central American and Caribbean Games, debuting with a 22:7 victory over Angel Gutierrez of Mexico. Pedraza advanced stopping Omar Ward in the second round. He defeated (10:1) Wellington Arias of the Dominican Republic in the semifinals. Pedraza won the old medal with a 10:2 victory over Cesar Villarraga of Colombia. On December 3, 2010, Pedraza participated in a dual against the United States defeating Duran Caferro, 16:3.

Professional career

Early career
Pedraza's intention to become a professional was made public on January 3, 2011. A press conference was held a week later, where he signed a contract with three different promoters, Universal Promotions of Puerto Rico, Gary Shaw Productions and DiBella Entertainment, who agreed to co-promote his career. His professional debut was scheduled for February 18, 2011. The opponent was Felix Rivera, who also debuted after compiling an amateur record of 68–5. Pedraza won the contest by technical knockout in the first round, following a combination to the head and body.
The following month he participated in his first contest outside of Puerto Rico, defeating Corben Page in the same manner. On June 10, 2011, Pedraza was included in a boxing card held prior to the Puerto Rican Day Parade, a tradition among the diaspora in New York. The contest was stopped in the first round, following two knockdowns over his opponent,  Tomi Archambault. The opponent for his first six-round fight was Pedro Antonio Salcedo. Pedraza outboxed and injured Salcedo several times, earning a unanimous decision, with identical scores of 60–54. Following a short hiatus, he defeated John Wampash by technical knockout in the fourth round. On December 30, 2011, only ten months after his debut, Pedraza participated in his first titular match, challenging for the World Boxing Council's Super Featherweight Youth World Championship. He won by technical knockout in the fifth round, when the referee retired an injured Herbert Quartey from the contest. He headlined Team Puerto Rico's first local card of 2012, "Pa' Bravo Yo", defeating Anthony Woods in the fourth round after his opponent's corner submitted the contest by throwing a towel into the ring.

IBF super-featherweight champion
On June 13, 2015, Pedraza captured the vacant International Boxing Federation junior lightweight world championship by defeating Russia's Andrey Klimov via unanimous decision. Pedraza successfully defended his championship twice, against Edner Cherry and Stephen Smith.

On January 14, 2017, he lost his IBF title to Gervonta Davis by seventh-round technical knockout.

Lightweight

On October 30, 2017, it was announced that Pedraza was now being managed by Victory Sports. It was also announced that Pedraza would now campaign in the lightweight division. On March 2, Top Rank announced they had signed Pedraza to a multi-fight promotional agreement.

March 17, Pedraza made his lightweight and Top Rank debut at Hulu Theater at Madison Square Garden, outpointing Jose Luis Rodriguez.

WBO lightweight champion 
On August 25, 2018, Pedraza knocked Raymundo Beltrán down in the eleventh round and beat him by unanimous decision, with scores of 117–110, 117–110 and 115–112, to win the WBO lightweight title and become a two-division world champion.

Pedraza's next fight was a unification bout on December 8, 2018, against WBA (Super) and The Ring lightweight champion Vasiliy Lomachenko. Pedraza lost by unanimous decision, with scores of 117–109, 117–109 and 119–107.

Pedraza vs. Lozara Jr 
In his next fight, Pedraza fought Antonio Lozada Jr, who was ranked #13 by the WBC at lightweight. Pedraza won the fight via a ninth-round TKO.

Pedraza vs. Zepeda 
In his next fight, Pedraza fought Jose Zepeda. Zepeda was ranked #9 by the WBC. Zepeda started off the fight strong. Pedraza fought his way back into at later in the fight, but it was not enough as Zepeda did enough through most of the rounds to earn the unanimous decision victory.

Pedraza vs. LesPierre 
On July 2, 2020, Pedraza fought Mikkel LesPierre. Pedraza dominated his opponent and dropped him twice en route to a convincing unanimous decision victory.

Professional boxing record

See also

List of super-featherweight boxing champions
List of lightweight boxing champions
List of IBF world champions
List of WBO world champions
List of IBO world champions
List of Puerto Rican boxing world champions

References

External links

Jose Pedraza - Profile, News Archive & Current Rankings at Box.Live

|-

Living people
1989 births
Super-featherweight boxers
Lightweight boxers
World super-featherweight boxing champions
International Boxing Federation champions
International Boxing Organization champions
Boxers at the 2007 Pan American Games
Boxers at the 2008 Summer Olympics
Olympic boxers of Puerto Rico
AIBA World Boxing Championships medalists
Pan American Games bronze medalists for Puerto Rico
Pan American Games medalists in boxing
Central American and Caribbean Games gold medalists for Puerto Rico
Competitors at the 2010 Central American and Caribbean Games
Puerto Rican male boxers
People from Caguas, Puerto Rico
Central American and Caribbean Games medalists in boxing
Medalists at the 2007 Pan American Games